These are the complete results of the 2017 European Team Championships Super League on 23–25 June 2017 in Lille, France. As with the previous championships there were a couple of rules applying specifically to this competition, such as the limit of three attempts in the throwing events, long jump and triple jump (only the top four were allowed the fourth attempt) and the limit of four misses total in the high jump and pole vault.

Background 

 Czech Republic, Greece and Netherlands were promoted from 2015 First League.
 Due to Russia's suspension, the competition is staged with 11 teams only and Russia is one of the three teams to be relegated to the European Athletics Team Championships First League 2019.

Men

100 metres

Qualification
Qualification: First 3 in each heat (Q) and the next 2 fastest (q) advance to the Final

Final

200 metres

Qualification
Qualification: First 3 in each heat (Q) and the next 2 fastest (q) advance to the Final

Final

400 metres

Qualification
Qualification: First 3 in each heat (Q) and the next 2 fastest (q) advance to the Final

Final

800 metres

1500 metres

3000 metres

5000 metres

3000 metres steeplechase

110 metres hurdles

Qualification
Qualification: First 3 in each heat (Q) and the next 2 fastest (q) advance to the Final

Final

400 metres hurdles

Qualification
Qualification: First 3 in each heat (Q) and the next 2 fastest (q) advance to the Final

Final

4 x 100 metres

4 x 400 metres

High jump

Pole vault

Long jump

Triple jump

Shot put

Discus throw

Hammer throw

Javelin throw

Women

100 metres

Qualification
Qualification: First 3 in each heat (Q) and the next 2 fastest (q) advance to the Final

Final

200 metres

Qualification
Qualification: First 3 in each heat (Q) and the next 2 fastest (q) advance to the Final

Final

Due to problems with the timing, all times were stopped by hand.

400 metres

Qualification
Qualification: First 3 in each heat (Q) and the next 2 fastest (q) advance to the Final

Final

800 metres

1500 metres

3000 metres

5000 metres

3000 metres steeplechase

100 metres hurdles

Qualification
Qualification: First 3 in each heat (Q) and the next 2 fastest (q) advance to the Final

Final

400 metres hurdles

Qualification
Qualification: First 3 in each heat (Q) and the next 2 fastest (q) advance to the Final

Final

4 x 100 metres

4 x 400 metres

High jump

Pole vault

Long jump

Triple jump

Shot put

Discus throw

Hammer throw

Javelin throw

References 
 Results

European Athletics Team Championships Super League
European
2017 in French sport
International athletics competitions hosted by France
Sport in Lille